Brandon Jefferson (born 25 November 1991) is an American professional basketball player for Tianjin Pioneers of the Chinese Basketball Association.

Professional career
After going undrafted in the 2014 NBA draft, Jefferson joined the Denver Nuggets for the 2014 NBA Summer League. In July 2014, Jefferson signed his first professional contract with Finnish club KTP-Basket.

In July 2015, Jefferson signed with German Club Phoenix Hagen.

On September 2, 2016, Jefferson signed a one-year deal with Slovenian club Union Olimpija.

On July 18, 2017, he signed a one-year deal with Italian club Pallacanestro Trapani.

Jefferson signed a deal with Orléans Loiret Basket of the French second division LNB Pro B on August 9, 2018. He was named the Pro B Most Valuable Player of the 2018–19 season. During the 2019-20 season, Jefferson averaged 16.1 points and 3.9 assists per game. On August 30, 2020, he signed with SIG Strasbourg. Jefferson averaged 16.2 points and 3.4 assists per game.

On August 9, 2021, he signed a two-year deal with Élan Béarnais.

On June 11, 2022, he signed with Tianjin Pioneers of the Chinese Basketball Association.

References

External links
NBA Prospect Profile
German League Profile
Eurobasket.com Profile
Metro State Roadrunners bio

1991 births
Living people
American expatriate basketball people in Finland
American expatriate basketball people in France
American expatriate basketball people in Germany
American expatriate basketball people in Italy
American expatriate basketball people in Slovenia
American men's basketball players
Basketball players from Texas
Élan Béarnais players
KK Olimpija players
Metro State Roadrunners men's basketball players
Orléans Loiret Basket players
People from Flower Mound, Texas
Phoenix Hagen players
Point guards